The 1981 Wake Forest Demon Deacons football team was an American football team that represented Wake Forest University during the 1981 NCAA Division I-A football season. In their first season under head coach Al Groh, the Demon Deacons compiled a 4–7 record and finished in sixth place in the Atlantic Coast Conference.

Schedule

Roster

Team leaders

References

Wake Forest
Wake Forest Demon Deacons football seasons
Wake Forest Demon Deacons football